Harker's Run (or Harkers Run, as shown on federal maps) is a stream originating in Preble County, Ohio. Harker's Run drains into Four Mile Creek on the eastern edge of the campus of Miami University in Oxford just north of where the Trenton Oxford Road crosses Four Mile/Talawanda Creek. At its highest point, the stream is at approximately  elevation. The stream is crossed by bridges on Bonham Road, Somerville Road, Hamilton Richmond Road, and Oxford Germantown Road.

Much of Harker's Run lies within the Bachelor Wildlife and Game Reserve, owned and managed by Miami University (Oxford Township, Butler County, Ohio). The preserve contains land once owned by Joseph M. Bachelor, a professor of English at the university from 1927 to 1946, which was willed to the university upon his death in 1947.

There is parking on the east side of the Ohio State Route 73 bridge across Four Mile/Talawanda Creek on the north side of the road.

See also
List of rivers of Ohio

References

 Western Biographical Publishing Co. (1882) Oxford Township A History and Biographical Cyclopædia of Butler County Ohio, Western Biographical Publishing Co., Cincinnati, Ohio. pp. 502–504.
 Wright, Charles. (1976).  "The Ballad of Elliot Harker and Ellen Vane."  The Oxford Press Bicentennial Series. Oxford, Ohio: The Oxford Press, published weekly between July 1975 and July 1976.

Rivers of Preble County, Ohio
Rivers of Ohio
Miami University
Rivers of Butler County, Ohio